is a Japanese author of light novels, best known as the author of the Horizon in the Middle of Nowhere and The Ending Chronicle light novel series.

Career 
After graduating from the Faculty of Economics at Josai University, Kawakami got a job at the video game development company TENKY. He worked on games such as Merriment Carrying Caravan, Sougakutoshi OSAKA and Twelve: Sengoku Fushinden.

In 1996, he made his debut as a writer by attaining the Gold Prize at the Dengeki Novel Prize for his novel Panzerpolis 1935. His notable works as a writer include The Ending Chronicle and Horizon in the Middle of Nowhere, which are set within the same canonical universe dubbed the Toshi Sekai or City World and span different eras of said universe.

Satoyasu, who also works for TENKY, has been illustrator for Kawakami's work since his third novel, Feng Shui Street Hong Kong. His debut work, Panzerpolis 1935, was illustrated by Shirou Ohno, and his second work, Aerial City, was illustrated by Koji Nakakita.

Writing style 
He writes long stories in a unique style that uses a lot of line breaks and stylistic devices such as taigendome, where a sentence ends with a taigen or indeclinable nominal instead of a copula. Many of his works are filled with originally coined words and philosophies with extensive usage of glossaries.

Kawakami's novels are well-known for their length, sometimes spanning one-thousand pages in a single volume. Due to this, his work contain by far the longest individual volumes published by Dengeki Bunko. In the final seven volumes of The Ending Chronicle, Kawakami finally surpassed 1,000 pages for the first time in the history of Dengeki Bunko (1,091 pages), an unprecedented feat for a light novel paperback. The record was broken again with the publishing of Horizon in the Middle of Nowhere II Part 2 (1,153 pages) and then again with the final volume of the series Horizon in the Middle of Nowhere XI Part 3 (1,160 pages).

Works
Most of Kawakami's works are set in a universe of his own creation. The history of this universe is divided into eras. Works set in the universe are labelled by the era they take place in (for instance Horizon in the Middle of Nowhere is the first series to take place in the GENESIS era, and is thus sometimes referred to as "the 1st GENESIS"). The eras are as follows, listed in chronological order:
FORTH
AHEAD
EDGE
GENESIS
OBSTACLE
CITY

Novels

CITY Series
 (1996, 1 volume)
 (1997, 1 volume)
 (1998, 2 volumes)
 (1999, 2 volumes)
 (1999–2000, 2 volumes)
 (2000–2001, 5 volumes)
 (2002, 2 volumes)
 (2003, 1 volume, mail order only)
 (2005, 1 volume, mail order only)

AHEAD Series
 (2003–2005, 14 volumes)

FORTH Series
 (2007, reprinted 2013, 2 volumes)

GENESIS Series
 (2008–2018, 29 volumes + 3 extra)

OBSTACLE Series
 (2015–2017, 4 volumes)

EDGE Series 
   (published online 2018–, in print 2019–, 4 volumes)

Awards
Dengeki Novel Prize
 1996 – Gold Prize, Panzerpolis 1935
 Kono Light Novel ga Sugoi!
 2005 – 3rd place in Best Male Character, Mikoto Sayama, The Ending Chronicle
 2006 – 5th place in Best Novel Series, The Ending Chronicle
 2006 – 2nd place in Best Male Character, Mikoto Sayama, The Ending Chronicle
 2007 – 7th place in Best Novel Series, The Ending Chronicle
 2007 – 1st place in Best Male Character, Mikoto Sayama, The Ending Chronicle
 2013 – 10th place in Best Novel Series, Horizon in the Middle of Nowhere
 2013 – 10th place in Best Male Character, Toori Aoi, Horizon in the Middle of Nowhere

References

External links 
 

Japanese writers
Light novelists
Living people
1975 births